On 2 December 2010, the European Broadcasting Union (EBU) announced that Italy would compete in the Eurovision Song Contest 2011, set to be held in Düsseldorf, Germany. Italy returned to the contest after a 13-year absence, having last competed in the 1997 contest. The entry was organised by Italian broadcaster Radiotelevisione Italiana (RAI) and finished second after the winning song from Azerbaijan.

Background

Italy was one of the seven participating countries to take part in the first contest in 1956. The Eurovision Song Contest was initially inspired by the Italian Sanremo Music Festival, held annually since 1951 in the city of Sanremo. Since their debut Italy has taken part 37 times, and has won the contest twice - in 1964 with the song "Non ho l'età" (I'm not old enough) performed by Gigliola Cinquetti, and in 1990 with "Insieme: 1992" (Together: 1992) performed by Toto Cutugno. Italy has also come 2nd once - again with Gigliola Cinquetti and the song "Sì", and 3rd four times - including the global hit song "Nel blu, dipinto di blu", also known as "Volare", performed by Domenico Modugno in 1958. Italy has also hosted the contest twice - in 1965 in Naples, and in 1991 in Rome.

Since their debut Italy has withdrawn from the contest a number of times. The first occurrence was in 1981, claiming that interest in the contest in Italy had diminished. Italy returned in 1983, and withdrew again in 1986, returning the following year. In 1994 Italy withdrew again, before returning again in 1997. After the 1997 contest Italy withdrew again, and did not return until the 2011 contest.

Return to Eurovision
Since their withdrawal in 1997 the EBU, the organisers of the Eurovision Song Contest, had worked hard to bring Italy back to Eurovision. Since the 2009 Contest the country's return - along with that of Monaco and Austria - was made a priority of the EBU.

In September 2010 it was announced by Massimo Liofredi, chairman of Rai 2, that the winner of the fourth series of the Italian version of The X Factor may represent Italy at the Eurovision Song Contest 2011, rather than compete in the Sanremo Music Festival as in previous years. This raised hopes that Italy would return to Eurovision after 14 years of absence. On 2 December 2010 the EBU announced on the official Eurovision website that Italy had applied for the 2011 Contest, set to be held on 10, 12 and 14 May 2011 in Düsseldorf, Germany.

Before Eurovision

Artist selection 

On 1 February 2011, Italian broadcaster RAI confirmed that the performer that would represent Italy at the 2011 Eurovision Song Contest would be selected by a special committee from the competing artists at the Sanremo Music Festival 2011. The committee consisted of Gianni Morandi, Mauro Mazza (Rai 1 director), Massimo Liofredi (Rai 2 director), Marco Simeon (director of international affairs), Maurizio Zoccarato (mayor of Sanremo) and Giorgio Giuffra (Sanremo's promotional board member). The competition took place between 15–19 February 2011 with the winner being selected on the last day of the festival. The competing artists in the "Big Artists" and "Newcomers" category were:

"Big Artists" Category 

 Al Bano
 Anna Oxa
 Anna Tatangelo
 Davide Van De Sfroos
 Giusy Ferreri
 La Crus
 Luca Barbarossa and Raquel del Rosario
 Luca Madonia and Franco Battiato
 Max Pezzali
 Modà feat. Emma
 Nathalie
 Patty Pravo
 Roberto Vecchioni
 Tricarico

"Newcomers" Category 

 Anansi
 BTwins
 Gabriella Ferrone
 Marco Menichini
 Micaela
 Raphael Gualazzi
 Roberto Amadè
 Serena Abrami

During the final evening of the Sanremo Music Festival 2011, Raphael Gualazzi was announced as the artist that would represent Italy at the Eurovision Song Contest 2011. Roberto Vecchioni was selected as the winner with the song "Chiamami ancora amore".

Song selection 
On 11 March 2011, RAI confirmed that Raphael Gualazzi would perform a bilingual Italian and English version of his Sanremo Music Festival 2011 Newcomers category winning song "Follia d'amore", which would be titled "Madness of Love" at the Eurovision Song Contest 2011.

At Eurovision
Italy automatically qualified for the grand final, on 14 May 2011; as part of the "Big Five", and would vote in the second semi-final. At the finals, the Italian entry performed 12th and in the voting, was placed second to the Azerbaijani entry Running Scared by Ell and Nikki with 189 points. The public awarded Italy 11th place with 99 points and the jury awarded 1st place with 251 points.

Voting

Points awarded to Italy

Points awarded by Italy

References

External links 
 Sanremo 2011 - Official site

2011
Countries in the Eurovision Song Contest 2011
Eurovision
Eurovision